Echo Music Prize (stylised as ECHO) was an accolade by the , an association of recording companies of Germany to recognize outstanding achievement in the music industry. The first ECHO Awards ceremony was held in 1992, and it was set up to honor musical accomplishments by performers for the year 1991, succeeding the Deutscher Schallplattenpreis, which was awarded since 1963. Each year's winner was determined by the previous year's sales. In April 2018, following controversy regarding that year's ceremony, the Bundesverband Musikindustrie announced the end of the award.

History
First held with 370 people in the Flora, Cologne in 1992, the award ceremony in Frankfurt was televised and the classical awards were moved to a separate event, Echo Klassik, in Cologne in 1994. Until 1995, only invited guests could attend the ceremony. It was held in Munich, and in 2001, the venue was moved from Hamburg to Berlin because of subsidies of up to 20 million euros, although a return in 2004 was considered. In 2009, the venue in Berlin was moved to Mercedes-Benz Arena.

Trophy
The trophy was designed by Oliver Renelt when he was a student at the Hochschule für bildende Künste Hamburg. It depicts half a disc with notes flowing into it from a globe, and the design was the winner of a competition held for that purpose.

Controversy 
The Echo Award was heavily criticized worldwide when Farid Bang and Kollegah received the award for best hip hop/urban album in April 2018. The nominated album, Jung, Brutal, Gutaussehend 3 (English: "Young, brutal, handsome 3"), contains the track "0815", in which the artists refer to their muscles as being more defined than those of Auschwitz inmates. The duo was even allowed to perform this track during the ceremony, despite heavy protests weeks before the award show.

Campino, singer of German punk band Die Toten Hosen, was the first one to criticize the committee's decision during the ceremony. His remarks received a standing ovation from the audience. Several artists later returned their Echo awards in protest, such as Marius Müller-Westernhagen, who returned all of his seven Echo awards received over the years. Other artists returning their awards were German conductors Christian Thielemann and Enoch zu Guttenberg, Russian-German pianist Igor Levit, record producer Klaus Voormann, and the Notos Quartett.

However, criticism did not only come from artists and the German press. Several businesses joined in, with Tom Enders, CEO of Airbus, being one of the most recent high-profile commentators, saying that this would hurt "Germany's international reputation". He also asked if "antisemitism [was] becoming acceptable in Germany" again.

As a consequence, the Echo Award was discontinued.

Ceremony locations

Echo Awards
The Kastelruther Spatzen have won 13 Echo Awards in the category Volksmusik which is more than any other artist; the awards were in 1993, 1996–2003, 2006–2010.

Selected pop categories

Best National Rock/Pop Male Artist
1992 Herbert Grönemeyer
1993 Marius Müller-Westernhagen
1994 Herbert Grönemeyer
1995 Marius Müller-Westernhagen
1996 Mark'Oh
1997 Peter Maffay
1998 Nana
1999 Marius Müller-Westernhagen
2000 Xavier Naidoo
2001 
2002 Peter Maffay
2003 Herbert Grönemeyer
2004 Dick Brave
2005 Gentleman
2006 Xavier Naidoo
2007 Roger Cicero
2008 Herbert Grönemeyer
2009 Udo Lindenberg
2010 Xavier Naidoo
2011 David Garrett
2012 Udo Lindenberg
2013 David Garrett
2014 Tim Bendzko
2015 Herbert Grönemeyer
2016 Andreas Bourani
2017 Udo Lindenberg
2018 Mark Forster

Best National Rock/Pop Female Artist
1992 Pe Werner
1993 Sandra
1994 Doro
1995 Marusha
1996 Schwester S.
1997 Blümchen
1998 Sabrina Setlur
1999 Blümchen
2000 Sabrina Setlur
2001 Jeanette
2002 Sarah Connor
2003 Nena
2004 Yvonne Catterfeld
2005 Annett Louisan
2006 Christina Stürmer
2007 LaFee
2008 LaFee
2009 Stefanie Heinzmann
2010 Cassandra Steen
2011 Lena
2012 Ina Müller
2013 Ivy Quainoo
2014 Ina Müller
2015 Oonagh
2016 Sarah Connor
2017 Ina Müller
2018 Alice Merton

Best International Rock/Pop Male Artist
1992 Phil Collins
1993 Michael Jackson
1994 Meat Loaf
1995 Bryan Adams
1996 Vangelis
1997 Eros Ramazzotti
1998 Jon Bon Jovi
1999 Eros Ramazzotti
2000 Ricky Martin
2001 Carlos Santana
2002 Robbie Williams
2003 Robbie Williams
2004 Robbie Williams
2005 Robbie Williams
2006 Robbie Williams
2007 Robbie Williams
2008 James Blunt
2009 Paul Potts
2010 Robbie Williams
2011 Phil Collins
2012 Bruno Mars
2013 Robbie Williams
2014 Robbie Williams
2015 Ed Sheeran
2016 Ed Sheeran
2017 Rag'n'Bone Man
2018 Ed Sheeran

Best International Rock/Pop Female Artist
1992 Cher
1993 Annie Lennox
1994 Bonnie Tyler
1995 Mariah Carey
1996 Madonna
1997 Alanis Morissette
1998 Toni Braxton
1999 Celine Dion
2000 Cher
2001 Britney Spears
2002 Dido
2003 Shakira
2004 Shania Twain
2005 Anastacia
2006 Madonna
2007 Katie Melua
2008 Nelly Furtado
2009 Amy Winehouse
2010 Lady Gaga
2011 Amy Macdonald
2012 Adele
2013 Lana Del Rey
2014 Birdy
2015 Zaz
2016 Adele
2017 Sia
2018 P!nk

Best Schlager Female Artist
1993 Nicole (German singer)

Best National Rock/Pop Group
1992 Scorpions
1993 Die Prinzen
1994 Die Toten Hosen
1995 Pur
1996 Pur
1997 Die Toten Hosen
1998 Tic Tac Toe
1999 Modern Talking
2000 Die Fantastischen Vier
2001 Pur
2002 No Angels
2003 Die Toten Hosen
2004 Pur
2005 Söhne Mannheims
2006 Wir sind Helden
2007 Rosenstolz
2008 Die Fantastischen Vier
2009 Ich + Ich
2010 Silbermond
2011 Ich + Ich
2012 Rosenstolz
2013 Die Toten Hosen
2014 The BossHoss
2015 Revolverheld
2016 Pur
2017 AnnenMayKantereit
2018 Milky Chance

Best International Rock/Pop Group
1992 Queen
1993 Genesis
1994 Ace of Base
1995 Pink Floyd
1996 The Kelly Family
1997 The Fugees
1998 Backstreet Boys
1999 Lighthouse Family
2000 Buena Vista Social Club and Ry Cooder
2001 Bon Jovi
2002 Linkin Park
2003 Red Hot Chili Peppers
2004 Evanescence
2005 Green Day
2006 Coldplay
2007 The Pussycat Dolls
2008 Linkin Park
2009 Coldplay
2010 Depeche Mode
2011 Take That
2012 Coldplay
2013 Mumford and Sons
2014 Depeche Mode
2015 Pink Floyd
2016 Coldplay
2017 Metallica
2018 Imagine Dragons

Best International Rock/Alternative
2001 Limp Bizkit (nominee: Blink-182, Kid Rock, Korn, Papa Roach )
2002 Linkin Park (nominee: Crazy Town, Gorillaz, HIM, Limp Bizkit)
2003 P.O.D. (nominee: Coldplay, Korn, Linkin Park, Puddle Of Mudd )
2004 Evanescence (nominee: Coldplay, Linkin Park, Metallica, The Rasmus )
2006 System of a Down (nominee: 3 Doors Down, Audioslave, Foo Fighters, Franz Ferdinand )
2007 Billy Talent (nominee: Bullet For My Valentine, Evanescence, Placebo, Tool ) 
2008 Nightwish (nominee: Foo Fighters, Kaiser Chiefs, Marilyn Manson, Within Temptation )
2009 AC/DC (nominee: 3 Doors Down, Metallica, R.E.M., Slipknot ) 
2010 Green Day (nominee: Billy Talent, Kings Of Leon, Mando Diao, Placebo ) 
2011 Linkin Park (nominee: Iron Maiden, Mando Diao, Thirty Seconds to Mars, Volbeat ) 
2012 Red Hot Chili Peppers: (nominee: Evanescence, Foo Fighters, Nickelback, Nightwish )
2013 Linkin Park (nominee: Billy Talent, Green Day, Muse, The Rolling Stones ) 
2014 Volbeat (nominee: Black Sabbath, Imagine Dragons, Placebo, Thirty Seconds to Mars )  
2015 AC/DC (nominee: Foo Fighters, Linkin Park, Nickelback, Slipknot )
2016 Iron Maiden (nominee: AC/DC, Motörhead, Nightwish, Placebo )

Single of the Year
2005 O-Zone: "Dragostea din tei"
2006 Madonna: "Hung Up"
2007 Silbermond: "Das Beste"
2008 DJ Ötzi feat. Nik P.: "Ein Stern (...der deinen Namen trägt)"
2009 Kid Rock: "All Summer Long"
2010 Lady Gaga: "Poker Face"
2011 Israel Kamakawiwoʻole: "Over the Rainbow"
2012 Gotye feat. Kimbra: "Somebody That I Used to Know"
2013 Die Toten Hosen: "Tage wie diese"
2014 Avicii: "Wake Me Up"
2015 Helene Fischer: "Atemlos durch die Nacht"
2016 Lost Frequencies: "Are You with Me"
2017 Drake: "One Dance"
2018 Ed Sheeran: "Shape of You"

Single of the Year (National)
1993 Snap!: "Rhythm is a Dancer"
1994 Haddaway: "What is Love"
1995 Lucilectric: "Mädchen"
1996 Scatman John: "Scatman"
1997 Andrea Bocelli and Sarah Brightman: "Time to Say Goodbye"
1998 Tic Tac Toe: "Warum"
1999 Oli.P: "Flugzeuge im Bauch"
2000 Lou Bega: "Mambo No. 5"
2001 Anton feat. DJ Ötzi: Anton aus Tirol
2002 No Angels: Daylight in Your Eyes
2003 Herbert Grönemeyer: "Mensch"
2004 Deutschland sucht den Superstar: "We Have a Dream"

Single of the Year (International)
2001 Rednex: "The Spirit of the Hawk"
2002 Enya: "Only Time"
2003 Las Ketchup: "The Ketchup Song (Aserejé)"
2004 RZA feat. Xavier Naidoo: "Ich kenne nichts"

Album of the Year
2008 Herbert Grönemeyer: 12
2009 Amy Winehouse: Back to Black
2010 Peter Fox: Stadtaffe
2011 Unheilig: Große Freiheit
2012 Adele: 21
2013 Die Toten Hosen: Ballast der Republik
2014 Helene Fischer: Farbenspiel
2015 Helene Fischer: Farbenspiel
2016 Helene Fischer: Weihnachten
2017 Udo Lindenberg: Stärker als die Zeit
2018 Ed Sheeran: ÷

Best National Newcomer
1991 Pe Werner
1992 Die Fantastischen Vier
1993 
1994 Six Was Nine
1996 Fettes Brot
1997 Fools Garden
1998 Nana
1999 Xavier Naidoo
2000 Sasha
2001 
2002 Seeed
2003 Wonderwall
2004 Wir sind Helden
2005 Silbermond
2006 Tokio Hotel
2007 LaFee
2008 Mark Medlock
2009 Thomas Godoj
2010 The Baseballs
2011 Lena
2012 Tim Bendzko
2013 Cro
2014 Adel Tawil
2015 Oonagh
2016 Joris
2017 AnnenMayKantereit
2018 Wincent Weiss

Best International Newcomer
1996 Alanis Morissette
1997 Spice Girls
1998 Hanson
1999 Eagle-Eye Cherry
2000 Bloodhound Gang [Nominee: Tarkan, Jennifer Lopez, Everlast, Britney Spears]
2001 Anastacia
2002 Alicia Keys
2003 Avril Lavigne
2004 The Rasmus
2005 Katie Melua
2006 James Blunt
2007 Billy Talent
2008 Mika
2009 Amy Macdonald
2010 Lady Gaga
2011 Hurts
2012 Caro Emerald
2013 Lana Del Rey (Nominee: Alex Clare, Emile Sande, Luca Hanni, Of Monsters And Men)
2014 Beatrice Egli
2015 The Common Linnets
2016 James Bay
2017 Rag'n'Bone Man
2018 Luis Fonsi

Honorary Award
1991 Udo Lindenberg
1992 Reinhard Mey
1993 Udo Jürgens
1994 James Last
1996 Klaus Doldinger
1997 Frank Farian
1998 Comedian Harmonists
1999 Falco
2000 Hildegard Knef
2001 Fritz Rau
2002 Caterina Valente
2003 Can
2004 Howard Carpendale
2005 Michael Kunze
2006 Peter Kraus
2007 Ralph Siegel
2008 Rolf Zuckowski
2009 Scorpions
2010 Peter Maffay
2011 Annette Humpe
2012 Wolfgang Niedecken
2013 Hannes Wader
2014 Yello
2015 Nana Mouskouri
2016 Puhdys
2017 Marius Müller-Westernhagen

Echo Klassik 

Following its first edition as a separate event in Cologne in 1994, the Echo Klassik has been held in the Semperoper in Dresden in 1996 and 2009, in Dortmund in 2003, in Gasteig in Munich from 2004 to 2008 and in 2014. In 2010 it was held in Essen. From 2011 until 2016 the award show was held in Berlin's Konzerthaus - only shortly intermitted in 2014. In 2017, the Echo Klassik took place in Hamburg's newly opened Elbphilharmonie.

Echo Jazz

Since 2010, the Echo Jazz awards have been given in thirty categories, including ensemble of the year, male and female singer of the year, record label, and lifetime achievement. In 2012 the criteria for entry included album release date and "two outstanding reviews from music journalists." Conductor Claus Ogermann was given the ECHO Jazz Lifetime Achievement Award in 2012. Awards are decided by a twelve-member jury based on critical and commercial appeal.

References

External links

 Echo Deutscher Musikpreis 

 
1992 establishments in Germany
Awards established in 1992
Awards disestablished in 2018
2018 disestablishments in Germany
German awards
German music awards
Jazz awards
Lists of award winners